Love Is All There Is is a 1996 romantic comedy film written and directed by Joseph Bologna and Renée Taylor, who also both star in the film.

Plot 
Love Is All There Is is a modern retelling of the Romeo and Juliet story, and it is set in the Bronx.

The Capomezzos, Bronx-born Sicilians, own a local catering business. They develop a bitter rivalry with the pretentious Malacicis, recent immigrants from Florence and owners of a fine Italian restaurant.

The Capomezzos' son, Rosario, falls in love with the Malacicis' daughter, Gina, after she replaces the star of the neighborhood church's staging of Romeo and Juliet. The rivalry intensifies after Rosario deflowers Gina after a fight with her parents.

The movie was made in a few locations in New York: it was filmed at Greentree Country Club in New Rochelle, and many scenes were shot in City Island, Bronx.

Cast 
 Lainie Kazan as Sadie Capomezzo
 Joseph Bologna as Mike Capomezzo
 Paul Sorvino as Piero Malacici
 Barbara Carrera as Maria Malacici
 Nathaniel Marston as Rosario Capomezzo
 Angelina Jolie as Gina Malacici
 Renée Taylor as Mona
 William Hickey as Monsignor
 Dick Van Patten as Dr. Rodino
 Abe Vigoda as Rudy
 Connie Stevens as Miss Deluca
 Joy Behar as Mary
 Vera Lockwood as Donna
 Sal Richards as Sal
 Annie Meisels as Dottie
 Bobby Alto as Joe Fasuli
 Randy K. Blackman as Flower Girl #1

External links 
 
 
 

1996 films
1996 romantic comedy films
American films based on plays
American independent films
Films based on Romeo and Juliet
American romantic comedy films
The Samuel Goldwyn Company films
Films set in the Bronx
City Island, Bronx
1996 independent films
Films produced by Elliott Kastner
1990s English-language films
1990s American films